Hsu Jo-ting (born 18 March 1990) is a Taiwanese fencer. She competed at the individual épée events at the 2010 Asian Games and 2012 Summer Olympics. She was the first athlete representing Chinese Taipei at an Olympic fencing event. In the first round she defeated Mona Hassanein of Egypt, but then was stopped 15–8 by Romania's Ana Maria Brânză, whom she considers as her sport hero.

References

1990 births
Living people
Fencers at the 2012 Summer Olympics
Olympic fencers of Taiwan
Taiwanese female épée fencers
Place of birth missing (living people)
Fencers at the 2010 Asian Games
Fencers at the 2014 Asian Games
Asian Games competitors for Chinese Taipei
21st-century Taiwanese women